Tennessee's 4th Senate district is one of 33 districts in the Tennessee Senate. It has been represented by Republican Jon Lundberg since 2016, succeeding fellow Republican Ron Ramsey.

Geography
District 4 is based in Kingsport and Bristol, the northern two cities in the Tri-Cities area, also including the nearby communities of Bloomingdale, Colonial Heights, Blountville, and Mountain City. The district, located in the far northeastern tip of the state, covers all of Johnson and Sullivan Counties as well as a small part of Carter County.

The district is located entirely within Tennessee's 1st congressional district, and overlaps with the 1st, 2nd, 3rd, and 4th districts of the Tennessee House of Representatives. It borders the states of North Carolina and Virginia.

Recent election results
Tennessee Senators are elected to staggered four-year terms, with odd-numbered districts holding elections in midterm years and even-numbered districts holding elections in presidential years.

2020

2016

2012

Federal and statewide results in District 4

List of members representing the district

References

4
Carter County, Tennessee
Johnson County, Tennessee
Sullivan County, Tennessee